Sigcawu is a South African surname that may refer to

Sigcawu ka Sarili  (died 1902), South African Royal
Daliza Sigcawu, South African royalty son of Sigcawu 
Salukaphathwa Gwebi'nkumbi Sigcawu (died 1921), South African royal and son of Sigcawu
Mpisekhaya Ngangomhlaba Sigcawu (died 1933), South African royalty and grandson of Sigcawu
Bungeni Zwelidumile Sigcawu(1906–1965), South African Xhosa King and grandson of Sigcawu
Xolilizwe Mzikayise Sigcawu (1926–2005), South African Xhosa King and descendant of Sigcawu
Zwelonke Sigcawu (1968–2019), South African Xhosa King and descendant of Sigcawu
Ahlangene Sigcawu (born 1970), South African Xhosa King and descendant of Sigcawu

Xhosa-language surnames